Throop may refer to:

Locations  
 Throop, Dorset
 Throop, New York, a town in Cayuga County
 Throop, Pennsylvania, a borough in Lackawanna County
 Throop College, the original name of the California Institute of Technology  (Caltech)
 Throop Peak, in the San Gabriel Mountains, California

People
 Adam Throop (born 1977), American soccer player
 Amos G. Throop (1811–1894), founder of Caltech
 Arthur Throop (1884–1973), Canadian ice hockey player
 Enos T. Throop (1784–1874), Governor of New York
 George B. Throop (1793–1854), New York and Michigan politician
 George H. Throop (1818–1896), American teacher and novelist
 George R. Throop, scholar of Greek and Chancellor of Washington University in St. Louis
 George Throop (baseball) (born 1950), American baseball player
 Tom Throop (born 1947), American politician

See also
 Throup, a surname